E!Sharp is a bimonthly English-language magazine which covers EU affairs and transatlantic relations by providing analysis and commentary. Its editorial offices are in Brussels, Belgium.

History and profile
E!Sharp was founded by Paul Adamson in 2002. The magazine was established to promote public interest on EU-related politics. For the first three years it was published on a monthly basis. Then it began to be published bimonthly. It also publishes a Jargon Alert guide which is available online. 

Contributors include: Philip Stephens, David Rennie and Matt Frei. The other significant contributors are Neil Kinnock, Eddie Izzard, Richard Curtis and Tony Blair.

Paul Adamson is also the publisher of E!Sharp. Jacki Davis also served as the editor of the magazine.

E!Sharp claims a readership of "decision-makers in both policymaking and business circles, in Brussels and in national capitals around the EU." Between January and June 2009 the magazine had a circulation of 14,756 copies.

See also

EUobserver
EURACTIV
Euronews
Politico Europe

References

External links
 

2002 establishments in Belgium
Bi-monthly magazines
English-language magazines
Magazines established in 2002
Magazines published in Brussels
Monthly magazines published in Belgium
Political magazines